The 2022 BET Hip Hop Awards was a recognition ceremony that was held on October 4, 2022, as the 17th installment of the BET Hip Hop Awards. The nominations were announced on September 12, 2022. The awards were hosted by Fat Joe.

Kendrick Lamar won the most awards at the ceremony, with six. Drake had the most nominations with 14, followed by Kanye West with 10 and Lamar with nine. Trina received the I Am Hip Hop Award.

Nominees

Hip Hop Artist of the Year 
 Cardi B
 Doja Cat
 Drake
 Future
 Kanye West 
 Kendrick Lamar
 Megan Thee Stallion

Hip Hop Album of the Year 
 Latto - 777
 Drake – Certified Lover Boy
 Kanye West – Donda
 Future – I Never Liked You
 Pusha T – It's Almost Dry
 Nas – King's Disease II
 Kendrick Lamar – Mr. Morale & the Big Steppers

Best Hip Hop Video 
 ASAP Rocky – "D.M.B."
 Baby Keem & Kendrick Lamar – "Family Ties"
 City Girls featuring Usher – "Good Love"
 Cardi B, Kanye West & Lil Durk – "Hot Shit"
 Bia & J. Cole – "London"
 Future featuring Drake & Tems – "Wait for U"
 Drake featuring Future & Young Thug – "Way 2 Sexy"

Best Collaboration 
 Baby Keem & Kendrick Lamar – "Family Ties"
 City Girls featuring Usher – "Good Love"
 Cardi B, Kanye West & Lil Durk – "Hot Shit"
 Drake featuring 21 Savage – "Jimmy Cooks"
 Benny the Butcher & J. Cole – "Johnny P's Caddy"
 Future featuring Drake & Tems – "Wait for U"
 Drake featuring Future & Young Thug – "Way 2 Sexy"

Best Duo/Group 
 42 Dugg & EST Gee
 Big Sean & Hit-Boy
 Birdman & YoungBoy Never Broke Again
 Blxst & Bino Rideaux 
 DaBaby & YoungBoy Never Broke Again
 EarthGang
 Styles P & Havoc

Best Live Performer 
 Cardi B
 Doja Cat
 Drake
 J. Cole
 Kanye West
 Kendrick Lamar
 Tyler, the Creator

Lyricist of the Year 
 Baby Keem
 Benny the Butcher
 Drake
 J. Cole
 Jack Harlow
 Jay-Z
 Kendrick Lamar

Video Director of the Year 
 Benny Boom
 Burna Boy
 Cole Bennett
 Colin Tilley
 Director X
 Kendrick Lamar & Dave Free
 Teyana Taylor

DJ of the Year 
 D-Nice
 DJ Cassidy
 DJ Drama
 DJ Kay Slay
 DJ Premier
 Kaytranada
 Mustard
 Nyla Symone
 LA Leakers: DJ Sourmilk & Justin Incredible

Producer of the Year 
 ATL Jacob
 Baby Keem
 Hit-Boy
 Hitmaka
 Kanye West
 Metro Boomin
 Pharrell Williams

Song of the Year 
 "Big Energy" – Produced by Dr. Luke & Vaughn Oliver (Latto)
 "F.N.F. (Let's Go)" – Produced by Hitkidd (Hitkidd & GloRilla)
 "First Class" – Produced by Rogét Chahayed, Jack Harlow, Jasper Harris, & Charlie Handsome (Jack Harlow)
 "Hot Shit" – Produced by Tay Keith & BanBwoi (Cardi B, Kanye West & Lil Durk)
 "Super Gremlin" – Produced by ATL Jacob & Jambo (Kodak Black)
 "Wait for U" – Produced by FnZ & ATL Jacob (Future featuring Drake & Tems)
 "Way 2 Sexy" – Produced by TM88 & Too Dope (Drake featuring Future & Young Thug)

Best Breakthrough Hip Hop Artist 
 GloRilla
 Baby Keem
 Blxst
 Doechii
 Fivio Foreign
 Nardo Wick
 Saucy Santana

Hustler of the Year 
 50 Cent
 Cardi B
 DJ Khaled
 Drake
 Jay-Z
 Kanye West
 Megan Thee Stallion

Sweet 16: Best Featured Verse 
 Drake – "Churchill Downs" (Jack Harlow)
 J. Cole – "Poke It Out" (Wale)
 J. Cole – "London" (Bia)
 Lil Baby – "Girls Want Girls" (Drake)
 Kanye West – "City of Gods" (Fivio Foreign & Alicia Keys)
 Drake – "Wait for U" (Future & Tems)
 Jadakiss – "Black Illuminati" (Freddie Gibbs)

Impact Track 
 Lizzo – "About Damn Time"
 Fivio Foreign, Kanye West & Alicia Keys – "City of Gods"
 Baby Keem & Kendrick Lamar – "Family Ties"
 Nas featuring Lauryn Hill – "Nobody"
 Latto – "Pussy"
 Kendrick Lamar – "The Heart Part 5"
 Doja Cat – "Woman"

Best Hip-Hop Platform 
 Caresha Please
 Drink Champs
 Big Boy's Neighborhood
 The Breakfast Club
 Complex
 HipHopDX
 Million Dollaz Worth of Game
 NPR Tiny Desk
 WorldStarHipHop
 Verzuz

Best International Flow 
 Benjamin Epps (France)
 Black Sherif (Ghana)
 BLXCKIE (South Africa)
 Central Cee (UK)
 Haviah Mighty (Canada)
 Knucks (UK)
 Le Juiice (France)
 Nadia Nakai (South Africa)
 Fazari Big Jue SZN (Liberia)
 DMD BIG BABY ( LIBERIA)

I Am Hip-Hop Award 
Trina

Cultural Influence Award 
 Tyler, the Creator

Performers 
Kodak Black
Armani White
GloRilla

References 

BET Hip Hop Awards
BET Hip Hop
BET Hip Hop
BET Hip Hop Awards
BET Hip Hop Awards